Brady Creek Reservoir is a reservoir on Brady Creek in McCulloch County, Texas in the United States.  The lake is just west of downtown Brady, Texas.  The dam and lake are managed by the City of Brady.  The reservoir was officially impounded in 1963.  The reservoir is also sometimes called Brady Reservoir or Brady Lake. The dam for Brady Creek Reservoir is 8,400 ft. long and 104 ft. high and has a storage capacity of 30,430 acre-Ft.

Fauna 
Brady Creek Reservoir has been stocked with species of fish intended to improve the utility of the reservoir for recreational fishing.  Fish present in Brady Creek Reservoir include largemouth bass, channel catfish, crappie, and white bass. The local fish populations have gradually been recovering after a golden algae bloom that occurred in February 2012 and the drought conditions last several years.

Flora 
On February 13, 2012 the Brady Texas reservoir was impacted by an algae bloom that resulted in fish kills. The algae was identified to be Prymnesium parvum, a golden algae that produces toxins fatal to animals with gills. The Brady Creek Reservoir has limited aquatic vegetation in most areas but there are some submerged plant species and standing timber.

Recreational uses
Boating and fishing on Brady Creek Reservoir are very popular.

References

External links
Facilities Map
Brady Creek Reservoir - Texas Parks & Wildlife

Reservoirs in Texas
Protected areas of McCulloch County, Texas
Bodies of water of McCulloch County, Texas